Abdullah Al-Edan  is a Qatar football defender who played for Qatar in the 1984 Asian Cup.

References

External links
Stats

Qatar international footballers
Qatari footballers
1984 AFC Asian Cup players
Qatar Stars League players
Living people
Association football defenders
Year of birth missing (living people)